Stef Clement (born 24 September 1982 in Tilburg) is a Dutch former professional cyclist, who competed between 2003 and 2018 for the Van Hemert Groep CT,  and  squads. He specialized in the time trial discipline, winning the Dutch National Time Trial Championships on four occasions. He also won the bronze medal in the 2007 World Championships time trial.

In December 2014 he was announced as part of the squad for the  team for 2015, joining the team alongside fellow  rider David Tanner. He returned to the renamed  team in 2017, when  folded.

Major results

2002
 1st  Time trial, National Under-23 Road Championships
2003
 1st Stage 7 Olympia's Tour
 5th Overall Tour of Slovenia
2004
 6th Chrono des Nations U23
2005
 1st  Overall Olympia's Tour
 2nd Chrono Champenois
 6th Rund um Düren
 7th Overall Cinturón a Mallorca
1st Stage 1 (ITT)
2006
 1st  Time trial, National Road Championships
 1st Stage 9 (ITT) Tour de l'Avenir
 5th Chrono des Nations
 10th Overall Circuit de la Sarthe
2007
 1st  Time trial, National Road Championships
 3rd  Time trial, UCI Road World Championships
 3rd Chrono des Nations
2008
 1st Chrono des Nations
 5th Overall Circuit de la Sarthe
 9th Time trial, Olympic Games
 9th Overall Critérium International
 10th Overall Bayern–Rundfahrt
2009
 1st  Time trial, National Road Championships
 1st Stage 8 Critérium du Dauphiné Libéré
 4th Overall Vuelta a Castilla y León
2010
 6th Overall Vuelta a Murcia
2011
 1st  Time trial, National Road Championships
 4th Chrono des Nations
 8th Overall USA Pro Cycling Challenge
2014
 Volta a Catalunya
1st  Mountains classification
1st Stage 6
 8th London–Surrey Classic
2015
 2nd  Time trial, European Games
2016
 2nd Overall Arctic Race of Norway
2017
 2nd Time trial, National Road Championships
 8th Overall Tour de l'Ain

Grand Tour general classification results timeline

See also
 List of Dutch Olympic cyclists

References

External links 

 
 
 
 
 
 
 

1982 births
Living people
Dutch male cyclists
Sportspeople from Tilburg
Cyclists at the 2008 Summer Olympics
Olympic cyclists of the Netherlands
Dutch cycling time trial champions
UCI Road World Championships cyclists for the Netherlands
European Games silver medalists for the Netherlands
Cyclists at the 2015 European Games
European Games medalists in cycling
Cyclists from North Brabant